Johan Wiik (8 March 1885 – 3 October 1970) was a Norwegian politician for the Labour Party.

He was born in Fosnes.

He was elected to the Norwegian Parliament from Nord-Trøndelag in 1928, and was re-elected on six occasions.

Wiik was deputy mayor of Namsos municipality 1925–1926 and mayor in 1927–1928.

References

1885 births
1970 deaths
Labour Party (Norway) politicians
Members of the Storting
Vice Presidents of the Storting
20th-century Norwegian politicians